Cathestecum (common name false grama) is a genus of the North American plants in the grass family.

The name is sometimes misspelled as Cathestechum.

 Species
 Cathestecum brevifolium Swallen - Mexico, El Salvador, Honduras, Guatemala, United States (Pima County in Arizona)
 Cathestecum erectum Vasey & Hack. - Mexico, El Salvador, Honduras, Guatemala, United States (Big Bend region in Texas, southern Arizona)
 Cathestecum prostratum J.Presl - Michoacán, Jalisco, Morelos, Oaxaca, Querétaro, Puebla, Guerrero
 Cathestecum varium Swallen - Puebla, Oaxaca

 formerly included
see Bouteloua 
 Cathestecum multifidum - Bouteloua multifida
 Cathestecum stoloniferum - Bouteloua reederorum

References

Poaceae genera
Chloridoideae